; born January 26, 1975) is a Japanese super welterweight shoot boxer, fighting out of Cesar Gym in Asakusa. He was the first Japanese national champion of shoot boxing at Super welterweight. He is the winner of S-cup in 2006 and the finalist of 2008 S-cup.

His real name is still Kenichi Ogata, but it is written as "尾形健一".

Biography

Young age
Kenichi Ogata was born in town of Yuya, Yamaguchi, Japan on January 26, 1975. "Yuya", his hometown, was merged with other towns into Nagato City in 2005. He graduated from Nagato High School.

Debut
He debuted in November 1994 as a professional shoot boxer.

On May 9, 1997, he participated Super Fight in the event of Shoot Boxing World Tournament 1997, and fought against Dany Bill from France. He was knocked down with right cross and knocked down with right upper cut again during 5R. His second threw the towel into the ring just after 2nd knock down. After this bout, he was hospitalized　because of nose broken.

On October 12, he participated "'97 The Festival of Martial Arts Special" as the representative of shoot boxing and fought against Sitisak Tor Anuson who was the champion of Lumpinee Stadium at Junior welterweight. This event was promoted by World Karate Association, but it is not WKA established in USA. Ogata was knocked out by cut with right elbow during 5R. After this bout, he was hospitalized　because of Orbital blowout fracture.

On April 26, 1998, he fought against Gilbert Ballantine from Netherlands in the event of "RKS Presents Shoot the Shooto XX". This was the comeback bout after he had been beaten by Sitisak and Bill. He won by the unanimous decision after 5R. He was going to be retired if he lost.

On October 20, 2001, he had the first Mixed martial arts(MMA) bout against Curtis Brigham at lightweight in the event of Rings because the Shoot Boxing Association had cooperation with Rings. He was beaten in 43 seconds by choke.

On July 7, 2002, he participated Shoot Boxing World Tournament 2002 to fight against Ngkau Spain under KOK rule of Rings in MMA bout, but the bout was resulted as draw after 3R.

Winning national title
He fought against Seiichiro Nishibayashi for the vacant first Japanese national title at "Junior falconweight" on June 4, 1998, and he cut Nishibayashi's bottom eyelid when he kicked head, and knocked down with punches during 3R. Nishibayashi stood up, but referee stopped the bout because of too much bleeding, and Ogata won by TKO at 2:15 during 3R and became the first champion. "Junior falconweight" was renamed to "Super seagullweight", and renamed to welterweight again on November 20, 2001, but Ogata's title was changed to Super welterweight, not welterweight.

On November 14, 1998, he challenged Ramon Dekkers' WPKL World Junior middleweight championship (-69.85 kg) in Chiyoda, Tokyo, but he was knocked out with left hook at 2:58 during 4R. Ogata was knocked down with left hook in the end of 1R, and with right cross during 3R.

On November 1, 2000, he participated K-1 J-MAX 2000 as the representative of shoot boxing, and fought against Sakon Kubosaka. He knocked out Kubosaka by left body shot with left knee during 5R.

On February 24, 2004, Ogata participated K-1 World MAX 2004 Japan Tournament and fought against Kozo Takeda in the quarter-final. He knocked down Takeda with left hook during 1R, but Ogata's second threw their towel into the ring just after 2R starts because he had hurt his leg during 1R when he stepped into Takeda to knock down. He explained that his left knee was injured badly in a bout on February 1, and he managed to train only for 4–5 days because of hematoma and Strain of his calf of his leg, moreover, he could not bend his knee more than 90 degrees. His condition had been bad,　but he decided to participate because of promise. The result of this bout is announced as Takeda's victory by the unanimous decision after 3R in the official website, but it is wrong.

Winning S-cup 2006
On November 3, 2006, Ogata participated Shoot Boxing World Tournament 2006. In the quarter-final, he knocked down Damacio Page with left body shot in 1R, but he was knocked down with right hook after that. Ogata knocked out Page with 2 knock downs by left body shots during 2R. In the semi-final, Ogata defeated Hiroki Shishido by the unanimous decision. In the final, Ogata knocked down Andy Souwer with right hook during 1R and won by the unanimous decision. Ogata won the tournament of S-cup as the second Japanese.

On November 30, 2007, he announced that he returns his title of Super welterweight in the beginning of the event because he was suggested to return his title by Caesar Takeshi when he consulted about his bad performance in bouts caused by his poor health. Caesar Takeshi answered "If you feel so, you should return your belt and try as much as possible from nothing to the end, and quit when you are convinced." during consulting.

Retirement
On November 2, 2010, he announced his retirement during the press conference of S-cup 2010, and he said he had a plan to hold his retirement ceremony in S-cup 2010. According to his explanation, he tried to continue his career, but he was stopped by doctor as his cervical vertebrae had not been recovered since the bout against Andy Souwer on November 24, 2008.

Titles

Professional
SHOOT BOXING
 1998 Shoot Boxing Japan Super Welterweight (Falconweight) Champion

Record

|-  bgcolor="#FFBBBB"
| 2009-06-01 || Loss ||align=left| Tyler Toner || Shoot Boxing 2009 Bushido 3rd || Bunkyo, Tokyo, Japan || KO (Right high kick) || 1 || 3:00
|-  bgcolor="#FFBBBB"
| 2008-11-24 || Loss ||align=left| Andy Souwer || Shoot Boxing World Tournament 2008 Final || Saitama, Saitama, Japan || KO (3 knockdowns) || 2 || 2:11
|-  bgcolor="#CCFFCC"
| 2008-11-24 || Win ||align=left| Luiz Azeredo || Shoot Boxing World Tournament 2008 Semi-final || Saitama, Saitama, Japan || KO (Right hook) || 2 || 2:11
|-  bgcolor="#CCFFCC"
| 2008-11-24 || Win ||align=left| Kenji Kanai || Shoot Boxing World Tournament 2008 Quarter-final || Saitama, Saitama, Japan || KO (Right straight) || 2 || 2:58
|-  bgcolor="#CCFFCC"
| 2008-09-12 || Win ||align=left| Jason Scerri || Shoot Boxing 2008 Tamashi - Road to S-cup - 5th || Bunkyo, Tokyo, Japan || TKO (Referee stoppage) || 3 || 0:56
|-  bgcolor="#CCFFCC"
| 2008-05-28 || Win ||align=left| Doo-Suk Oh || Shoot Boxing 2008 Tamashi - Road to S-cup - 3rd || Bunkyo, Tokyo, Japan || Decision (Majority) || 3 || 3:00
|-  bgcolor="#FFBBBB"
| 2007-10-28 || Loss ||align=left| Brian Lo-A-Njoe || Shoot Boxing Battle Summit Ground Zero Tokyo 2007 || Sumida, Tokyo, Japan || KO (Right hook) || 2 || 0:44
|-  bgcolor="#FFBBBB"
| 2007-07-28 || Loss ||align=left| Adam Higson || Shoot Boxing 2007 Mu-So 3rd || Bunkyo, Tokyo, Japan || Decision (Unanimous) || 3 || 3:00
|-  bgcolor="#CCFFCC"
| 2007-05-25 || Win ||align=left| Xu Yan || Shoot Boxing 2007 Mu-So 2nd || Bunkyo, Tokyo, Japan || KO (Body shot with left knee) || 3 || 0:56
|-  bgcolor="#FFBBBB"
| 2007-02-25 || Loss ||align=left| Big Ben Kesa Gym || Shoot Boxing 2007 Mu-So 1st || Bunkyo, Tokyo, Japan || KO (Right hook) || 2 || 1:04
|-  bgcolor="#CCFFCC"
| 2006-11-03 || Win ||align=left| Andy Souwer || Shoot Boxing World Tournament 2006 Final || Chiyoda, Tokyo, Japan || Decision (Unanimous) || 3 || 3:00
|-
! style=background:white colspan=9 |
|-
|-  bgcolor="#CCFFCC"
| 2006-11-03 || Win ||align=left| Hiroki Shishido || Shoot Boxing World Tournament 2006 Semi-final || Chiyoda, Tokyo, Japan || Decision (Unanimous) || 3 || 3:00
|-  bgcolor="#CCFFCC"
| 2006-11-03 || Win ||align=left| Damacio Page || Shoot Boxing World Tournament 2006 Quarter-final || Chiyoda, Tokyo, Japan || KO (Left body shot) || 2 || 1:14
|-  bgcolor="#CCFFCC"
| 2006-09-23 || Win ||align=left| Takashi Ohno || WSBA "Shoot Boxing 2006 Neo ΟΡΘΡΟΣ Series 5th" || Chiyoda, Tokyo, Japan || Decision (Unanimous) || 5 || 3:00
|-  bgcolor="#CCFFCC"
| 2006-07-07 || Win ||align=left| Ryan Diaz || WSBA "Shoot Boxing 2006 Neo ΟΡΘΡΟΣ Series 4th" || Chiyoda, Tokyo, Japan || Decision (Unanimous) || 5 || 3:00
|-  bgcolor="#CCFFCC"
| 2006-05-26 || Win ||align=left| Paul Smith || WSBA "Shoot Boxing 2006 Neo ΟΡΘΡΟΣ  Series 3rd" || Bunkyo, Tokyo, Japan || KO (Punches) || 2 || 2:57
|-  bgcolor="#CCFFCC"
| 2006-03-25 || Win ||align=left| Kim Yeon Jong || WSBA "Shoot Boxing 2006 Neo ΟΡΘΡΟΣ  Series 2nd" || Tokyo, Japan || TKO || 4 || 1:35
|-  bgcolor=
| 2006-02-09 || Ex ||align=left| Andy Souwer || WSBA "Shoot Boxing 2006 Neo ΟΡΘΡΟΣ Series 1st" || Bunkyo, Tokyo, Japan || No Decision || 1 || 2:00
|-
! style=background:white colspan=9 |
|-
|-  bgcolor="#CCFFCC"
| 2005-11-25 || Win ||align=left| Karimi Shonan || WSBA "Shoot Boxing 20th Anniversary Series Final" || Bunkyo, Tokyo, Japan || KO (Right straight) || 3 || 0:53
|-  bgcolor="#FFBBBB"
| 2005-06-26 || Loss ||align=left| Chi Bin Lim || WSBA "Shoot Boxing 20th Anniversary Series 3rd" || Bunkyo, Tokyo, Japan || TKO (Doctor stoppage, cut) || 2 || 3:00
|-  bgcolor="#CCFFCC"
| 2005-03-06 || Win ||align=left| Shane Wiggand || WSBA "Shoot Boxing 20th Anniversary Series First" || Bunkyo, Tokyo, Japan || KO (3 knockdowns) || 2 || 1:44
|-  bgcolor="#CCFFCC"
| 2005-01-23 || Win ||align=left| Serkan Yilmaz || Shoot Boxing 2005 Ground Zero Fukuoka || Fukuoka, Fukuoka, Japan || Decision (Unanimous) || 6 (Ex.1) || 3:00
|-  bgcolor="#CCFFCC"
| 2004-12-03 || Win ||align=left| Peter Kaljevic || WSBA "∞-S Vol.6" || Osaka, Osaka, Japan || Decision (Unanimous) || 5 || 3:00
|-  bgcolor="#FFBBBB"
| 2004-09-19 || Loss ||align=left| Katel Kubis || Shoot Boxing World Tournament 2004 Quarter-final || Yokohama, Kanagawa, Japan || TKO (Doctor stoppage, cut) || 1 || 1:32
|-  bgcolor="#CCFFCC"
| 2004-04-18 || Win ||align=left| Jake Hattan || WSBA "∞-S Vol.2" || Bunkyo, Tokyo, Japan || TKO (Towel thrown) || 2 || 3:00
|-  bgcolor="#FFBBBB"
| 2004-02-24 || Loss ||align=left| Kozo Takeda || K-1 World MAX 2004 Japan Tournament || Shibuya, Tokyo, Japan || TKO (Towel thrown) || 1 || 3:00
|-  bgcolor="#CCFFCC"
| 2004-02-01 || Win ||align=left| Ngkau Spain || WSBA "∞-S Vol.1" || Bunkyo, Tokyo, Japan || KO (3 knockdowns)|| 2 || 2:22
|-  bgcolor="#CCFFCC"
| 2003-12-07 || Win ||align=left| Vladislav Klikfeld || WSBA "S" of the World Vol.6" || Osaka, Osaka, Japan || KO (3 knockdowns) || 2 || 1:32
|-  bgcolor="#FFBBBB"
| 2003-06-01 || Loss ||align=left| Shane Chapman || WSBA "S" of the World Vol.3" || Bunkyo, Tokyo, Japan || Decision (Unanimous) || 5 || 3:00
|-  bgcolor="#CCFFCC"
| 2003-04-13 || Win ||align=left| Ryland Mahoney || WSBA "S" of the World Vol.2" || Bunkyo, Tokyo, Japan || KO (Body shot) || 3 || 1:50
|-  bgcolor="#FFBBBB"
| 2002-11-04 || Loss ||align=left| Andy Souwer || WSBA "The age of "S" Vol.5" || Bunkyo, Tokyo, Tokyo || Decision (Unanimous) || 5 || 3:00
|-  bgcolor="#CCFFCC"
| 2002-05-13 || Win ||align=left| Jeremy Allen || WSBA "The age of "S" Vol.3" || Osaka, Osaka, Japan || Decision (Unanimous) || 5 || 3:00
|-  bgcolor="#CCFFCC"
| 2002-03-31 || Win ||align=left| Tony Valente || WSBA "The age of "S" Vol.2" || Bunkyo, Tokyo, Tokyo || TKO (3 knockdowns) || 3 || 2:54
|-  bgcolor="#CCFFCC"
| 2002-02-01 || Win ||align=left| Jermaine Pielow || WSBA "The age of "S" Vol.1" || Bunkyo, Tokyo, Tokyo || KO (Right hook) || 4 || 2:37
|-  bgcolor="#CCFFCC"
| 2001-11-20 || Win ||align=left| Daniel Silva || WSBA "Be A Champ 4th Stage" || Bunkyo, Tokyo, Tokyo || KO (Middle kick) || 2 || 2:36
|-  bgcolor="#CCFFCC"
| 2001-09-25 || Win ||align=left| Hong Guo || WSBA "Be A Champ 3rd Stage" || Bunkyo, Tokyo, Tokyo || TKO (Gave up) || 4 || 0:00
|-  bgcolor="#FFBBBB"
| 2001-07-9 || Loss ||align=left| Daniel Dawson || X-Plosion On Jupiter || Gold Coast, Australia || TKO (Corner Stop/Knee to Body) || 3 || 
|-
! style=background:white colspan=9 |
|-
|-  bgcolor="#CCFFCC"
| 2001-04-30 || Win ||align=left| Jong-Gong Kim || WSBA "Be A Champ 2nd Stage" || Bunkyo, Tokyo, Tokyo || KO (3 knockdowns) || 1 || 4:33
|-  bgcolor="#CCFFCC"
| 2000-11-30 || Win ||align=left| Elizabeth Oliver || WSBA "Invade 5th Stage" || Bunkyo, Tokyo, Japan || Decision (Unanimous) || 3 || 3:00
|-  bgcolor="#CCFFCC"
| 2000-11-01 || Win ||align=left| Sakon Kubosaka || K-1 J-MAX 2000 || Bunkyo, Tokyo, Japan || KO (Left body shot) || 5 || 2:03
|-  bgcolor="#CCFFCC"
| 2000-09-20 || Win ||align=left| David Morrow || WSBA "Invade 4th Stage" || Bunkyo, Tokyo, Japan || KO (Punches) || 1 || 1:44
|-  bgcolor="#CCFFCC"
| 2000-05-21 || Win ||align=left| Kit Cope || WSBA "Invade 3rd Stage" || Bunkyo, Tokyo, Japan || Decision (Unanimous) || 3 || 3:00
|-  bgcolor="#FFBBBB"
| 1999-06-10 || Loss ||align=left| Douglas Alan Evans || WSBA "Against 1999 2nd" || Bunkyo, Tokyo, Japan || KO || 1 || 1:34
|-  bgcolor="#CCFFCC"
| 1999-03-10 || Win ||align=left| David Solomon || WSBA "Against 1999 1st" || Bunkyo, Tokyo, Japan || TKO (Towel thrown) || 1 || 1:31
|-  bgcolor="#FFBBBB"
| 1999-04-24 || Loss ||align=left| John Wayne Parr || MAJKF || Bunkyo, Tokyo, Tokyo || KO (Left hook) || 2 || 1:49
|-  bgcolor="#FFBBBB"
| 1998-11-14 || Loss ||align=left| Ramon Dekkers || WSBA "Ground Zero Tokyo" || Chiyoda, Tokyo, Japan || KO(Left hook) || 4 || 2:58
|-
! style=background:white colspan=9 |
|-
|-  bgcolor=
| 1998-09-05 || Ex ||align=left| Taro Minato || WSBA "SB the Coming Generation" || Bunkyo, Tokyo, Japan || No Decision || 2 || 2:00
|-
! style=background:white colspan=9 |
|-
|-  bgcolor="#CCFFCC"
| 1998-07-17 || Win ||align=left| Ryuji Goto || WSBA "SK-XX 3rd" || Osaka, Osaka, Japan || TKO(dislocation) || 3 || 0:54
|-  bgcolor="#CCFFCC"
| 1998-06-04 || Win ||align=left| Seiichiro Nishibayashi || WSBA "SK-XX 2nd" || Bunkyo, Tokyo, Tokyo || TKO (Cut) || 3 || 2:15
|-
! style=background:white colspan=9 |
|-
|-  bgcolor="#CCFFCC"
| 1998-04-26 || Win ||align=left| Gilbert Ballantine || WSBA "RKS Presents Shoot the Shooto XX" || Yokohama, Kanagawa, Japan || Decision (Unanimous) || 3 || 3:00
|-  bgcolor="#FFBBBB"
| 1997-10-12 || Loss ||align=left| Sitisak Tor Anuson || WKA "'97 The Festival of Martial Arts Special" || Sumida, Tokyo, Japan || KO (Right elbow) || 5 || 1:39
|-  bgcolor="#FFBBBB"
| 1997-05-09 || Loss ||align=left| Dany Bill || Shoot Boxing World Tournament 1997, Super Fight || Shibuya, Tokyo, Japan || TKO (Towel thrown) || 5 || 1:42
|-  bgcolor="#CCFFCC"
| 1997-03-23 || Win ||align=left| Lafayette Lawson || WSBA ||  || KO || 1 ||
|-  bgcolor="#CCFFCC"
| 1996-07-14 || Win ||align=left| Marcelo Oliveira Aguiar || Shoot Boxing - S Cup 1996 || Koto, Tokyo, Japan || Decision (Unanimous) || 3 || 3:00
|-  bgcolor="#CCFFCC"
| 1996-05- || Win ||align=left| Takashi Ito || MAJKF || Bunkyo, Tokyo, Japan || Decision || 5 || 3:00
|-  bgcolor="#FFBBBB"
| 1996-01-27 || Loss ||align=left| Tatsuya Suzuki || Shootfighting Carnival Ground Zero Yokohama - Fighting Festival - || Yokohama, Kanagawa, Japan || Decision (Unanimous) || 3 || 3:00

|-  bgcolor="#c5d2ea"
| 2002-07-07 || Draw ||align=left| Ngkau Spain || Shoot Boxing World Tournament 2002, Super Fight || Yokohama, Kanagawa, Japan || Draw (0-0) || 3 || 5:00
|-  bgcolor="#FFBBBB"
| 2001-10-20 || Loss ||align=left| Curtis Brigham || Rings "World Title Series" || Shibuya, Tokyo, Japan || Submission (Choke) || 1 || 0:43
|-
| colspan=9 | Legend:

Mixed martial arts record

|-
| Draw
| align=center| 0-1-1
| Narkou Spain
| Draw
| Shoot Boxing - S-Cup 2002
| 
| align=center| 3
| align=center| 5:00
| Kanagawa, Japan
| 
|-
| Loss
| align=center| 0-1
| Curtis Brigham
| Submission (Rear Naked Choke)
| Rings: World Title Series 4
| 
| align=center| 1
| align=center| 0:43
| Tokyo, Japan
|

Titles 
1st Shoot Boxing Japanese Junior falconweight (Super welterweight) Champion (Defense: 0)
2008 Shoot boxing World tournament 2nd place
2006 Shoot boxing World tournament champion

See also 
List of male kickboxers
List of K-1 Events

References

External links
Kenichi Ogata Shoot boxing profile

1975 births
Living people
Japanese male kickboxers
Welterweight kickboxers
Japanese male mixed martial artists
Lightweight mixed martial artists
Mixed martial artists utilizing shootboxing
Mixed martial artists utilizing judo
Japanese male judoka
Sportspeople from Tokyo